Golestan Sara (also Romanized as Golestān Sarā) is a village in Khara Rud Rural District, in the Central District of Siahkal County, Gilan Province, Iran. At the 2006 census, its population was 64, in 17 families.

References 

Populated places in Siahkal County